Kazimierz Kowalski (30 July 1951 – 1 August 2021) was a Polish operatic bass and opera manager at the  Grand Theatre, Łódź, and a radio and television presenter. He founded an opera and operetta festival in the spa town Ciechocinek in 1998, and also the Polish Chamber Opera.

Life and career 
Born in Łódź, the son of theatrical actor Wiesław Wierusz-Kowalski, Kowalski studied voice at the Academy of Music with Antoni Majak, who was a singer and one of the founders of the Łódź Opera. Kowalski participated in the 1976 International Vocal Competition in Toulouse, achieving the highest (third) prize. The same year, he was engaged as a soloist at the Teatr Wielki (Grand Theatre) in Łódź, making his debut in the role of Kecal in Smetana's The Bartered Bride, and went on to perform leading roles.

From 1994 to 1997, he was the theatre's general and artistic director. During his era, he led a live worldwide television broadcast of Moniuszko's The Haunted Manor. The theatre was one of the few profitable theatrical institutions in Poland during his tenure. In 1998 a new theatre, the Summer Theatre, opened in the spa town Ciechocinek, where he initiated a festival of opera and operetta, managing it for more than 20 years. He also founded the Polish Chamber Opera.

Kowalski appeared on radio and television in shows such as Good evening, this is Lodz and Kazimierz Kowalski invites you. From 2000, he presented a series on Polish Radio about notable Polish artists. He ran a series on Radio Łódź titled Henryk Debich's Archive.

Kowalski managed the Grand Theatre again from 2005 to November 2008. The theatre's obituary noted:

Kowalski died on 1 August 2021, two days after his 70th birthday. He had planned to celebrate his career of 50 years in October 2021.

Operatic roles 
Operatic roles at the Grand Theatre included:

References

External links 

 
 
 Kazimierz Kowalski (in Polish) 
 Kazimierz Kowalski (in Polish) filmpolski.pl

1951 births
2021 deaths
People from Łódź
20th-century Polish  male opera singers
Polish radio presenters
Polish television presenters
Recipients of the Cross of Merit (Poland)
Recipients of the Bronze Medal for Merit to Culture – Gloria Artis
Operatic basses